The small harvest mouse (Reithrodontomys musseri) is a species of rodent in the family Cricetidae. It is found in central Costa Rica.

References

Reithrodontomys
Mammals described in 2009